Kanathil Jameela is an Indian politician and the elected member of Kerala Legislative Assembly representing Koyilandi Constituency as the member of Communist Party of India (Marxist) since May 2021, and she was the former President of District Panchayath Kozhikode.

Political career

References 

Malayali politicians
People from Kozhikode district
Living people
Communist Party of India (Marxist) politicians from Kerala
Kerala MLAs 2021–2026
20th-century Indian women politicians
20th-century Indian politicians
21st-century Indian women politicians
21st-century Indian politicians
Year of birth missing (living people)
Women members of the Kerala Legislative Assembly